Girl in the Picture is an American Netflix original documentary film directed by Skye Borgman. It's based on the books A Beautiful Child and Finding Sharon by Matt Birkbeck, who also serves as executive producer. The story is centered around a young girl known as Sharon Marshall, who was abducted by a federal fugitive Franklin Delano Floyd and then raised as his daughter. Over the course of the next two decades, she was sexually assaulted by Floyd, forced to marry him and ultimately died in a suspicious hit-and-run accident in 1990. The film follows the shocking events that transpired afterward, and the years-long efforts by Birkbeck, the National Center for Missing & Exploited Children and the FBI to find her true identity. The film was released on July 6, 2022.

Reception 
Upon its release,Girl In The Picture quickly became a worldwide phenomenon and remained the number one movie on Netflix for several weeks. 
On the review aggregator website Rotten Tomatoes, the film has a positive review of 96% based on 23 critics' reviews.

References

External links 

2022 films
2022 documentary films
Netflix original documentary films
Documentary films about crime in the United States
American documentary films
2020s English-language films
2020s American films